Mormon Island was once a mining town, which had an abundance of Mormon immigrants seeking gold in the American River during the California Gold Rush. Its site is in present-day Sacramento County, California.

History
Early in March 1848, W. Sidney, S. Willis, and Wilford Hudson, members of the Mormon Battalion, set out from Sutter's Fort to hunt deer. Stopping on the south fork of the American River, they found gold. They told their story on returning to the fort, and soon about 150 Mormons and other miners flocked to the site, which was named Mormon Island. This was the first major gold strike in California after James W. Marshall's discovery at Coloma. The first ball in Sacramento County was held there on December 25, 1849.

The population of the town in 1853 was more than 2,500. It had four hotels, three dry-goods stores, five general merchandise stores, an express office, and many small shops. R. C. Chambers had moved to Mormon Island in July 1850, prior to his mining successes in Montana and Utah.

A fire destroyed the town in 1856, and it was never rebuilt. The community dwindled after the California gold rush and only a scattered few families were left in the 1940s.

What was left of Mormon Island was eventually razed, as the Folsom Dam project was set to flood the town. The only visible remnant of this community is Mormon Island Cemetery, a relocation cemetery located south of the lake on the dry side of Mormon Island Dam (off of Green Valley Road in Folsom, California). The cemetery also contains remains exhumed from other cemeteries that were inundated by the creation of Folsom Lake as well as relocated graves from Prairie City which were unearthed during construction of an on-ramp to U.S. Route 50 from Prairie City Road.

Mormon Island is now registered as California Historical Landmark #569. Because the former site is under Folsom Lake, the historic marker is placed at the Folsom Point picnic area of Folsom Lake State Recreation Area.

Geographical information
The "island" was formed by the American River to the western, northern, and eastern sides and a man-made canal formed the southern side. The canal was used to divert water in an effort to find gold deeper within the river bed. Over time, the bulk of the town formed south of this site.

When the lake is at very low levels, some foundations of buildings and an arched bridge can be seen.  Some outskirts of the town were exposed in late 2013 and early 2014 when Folsom Lake was at a record low due to the 2012–14 North American drought, but most of the town remains underwater.

See also
 
 St. Thomas, Nevada, another former Mormon community submerged by a man-made lake
 Mormon Island (Colorado River), an island in the Colorado River below the mouth of the Virgin River.
 Mormon Island in San Pedro Bay (California)

References

External links
 Negro Hill Cemetery Relocation from the US Army Corps of Engineers, Sacramento District
 Mormon Island History from myfolsom.com
 Pictures of Mormon Island during a drought, Raise The Stakes Editions

Ghost towns in California
Mining communities of the California Gold Rush
Former settlements in Sacramento County, California
American River (California)
California Historical Landmarks
Folsom, California
History of the Latter Day Saint movement
The Church of Jesus Christ of Latter-day Saints in California